Gasman is a surname. Notable people with the surname include:

 David Gasman (born  1960), American actor, voice artist, director and translator
 Ira Gasman ( 1942–2018), American playwright, lyricist and newspaper columnist
 Marybeth Gasman, American professor of education